Eric Niklas Henning (born 6 March 1964) is a Swedish former alpine skier who competed in the 1984 and 1988 Winter Olympics. He also won a Super-G World Cup competition in Val d'Isère on 10 December 1989, which was his only World Cup competition victory.

World Cup competition victories

References

External links
 sports-reference.com

1964 births
Swedish male alpine skiers
Alpine skiers at the 1984 Winter Olympics
Alpine skiers at the 1988 Winter Olympics
Olympic alpine skiers of Sweden
Sportspeople from Stockholm
Living people